Abdullah Mohamed Al-Jumaan Al-Dosari (born 10 November 1977) is a Saudi Arabian footballer.

Career
At the club level, Al-Dosari played most of his career for Al-Hilal.

He also played for the Saudi Arabia national football team, and was a participant at the 2002 FIFA World Cup. Al-Dosari won 43 caps, scoring 17 goals for Saudi Arabia.

References

1977 births
Living people
Saudi Arabian footballers
Saudi Arabia international footballers
2002 FIFA World Cup players
2000 AFC Asian Cup players
Al Hilal SFC players
Al-Ahli Saudi FC players
Association football forwards
Saudi Professional League players